The 2005 Potters Holidays World Indoor Bowls Championship  was held at Potters Leisure Resort, Hopton on Sea, Great Yarmouth, England, in 2005.

Winners

Draw and results

Men's singles

Finals

Top Half

Bottom Half

Women's singles

Men's Pairs

Mixed Pairs

References

External links
Official website

2005 in bowls
World Indoor Bowls Championship